United Arab Emirates competed at the 2017 World Aquatics Championships in Budapest, Hungary from 14 July to 30 July.

Swimming

United Arab Emirates has received a Universality invitation from FINA to send a female swimmer to the World Championships.

References

Nations at the 2017 World Aquatics Championships
United Arab Emirates at the World Aquatics Championships
2017 in Emirati sport